KQSD may refer to:

 KQSD-FM, a radio station (91.9 FM) licensed to Lowry, South Dakota, United States
 KQSD-TV, a television station (channel 15) licensed to Lowry, South Dakota, United States